6th Sich Rifle Division - a division of the Ukrainian People's Army. It fought in the Kiev Offensive of 1920 and in further actions against the Red Army, including the Battle of Komarów.

Formation 
This division was initially formed in Łańcut, and then in the Brest-Litovsk fortress. Later it received the title of the "6th Sich Division" and was commanded by pidpolkovnyk Marko Bezruchko. On April 22, it was subordinated to the Polish 3rd Army and was ordered to march to the front. At that time, it numbered over 2,000 soldiers.

History 
By April 1920, the 6th Division had undergone intensive one-and-a-half-month training in Berdychiv, whose military garrison it formed. The division was additionally replenished with Ukrainian soldiers from other internment camps. Simultaneously, its personnel were fully armed, as the division received all the necessary military equipment and horses. At this time, the division's 6th Reserve Brigade was formed with a temporary headquarters in this city. After inspecting the division in Berdychiv, the Chief Ataman of the UPR's Army, Symon Petliura, presented the division with a raspberry-coloured Cossack flag with a golden trident in a blue upper rectangle with the inscription "For the Liberation of Ukraine".

According to Lech Wyszczelski, in May 1920, the 6th Sich Rifle Division was a "very weak tactical relationship (...) it had few cadres enabling it to achieve the status of the Polish division in the long term." From May 8 to June 9, 1920, the 6th Division was in Kyiv as the capital's Ukrainian garrison. The division partook in the Polish-Ukrainian victory military parade on the Khreshchatyk. On 12 June 1920, the 6th Division had 225 officers and 1,720 soldiers (of which 301 were untrained).

In August 1920, the division, together with the Polish , successfully defended Zamość from the 29 to 31 August, against Budyonny's 1st Cavalry Army, which contributed to the victory at the Battle of Warsaw.

In September 1920, the division was transferred to Galicia, where it shared the fate of the UPR's Army. In late September, the division liberated Proskuriv and Starokostiantyniv counties . From the 1 to 6 October, the 6th Division led forces fighting with the Red Army on Vinkivtsi. Already after the supposed end of hostilities under the Treaty of Riga, the 6th Division entered the villages of Vinkovetsky district (modern Khmelnytsky region) on October 13. On October 15, the offensive began in Bar. At the end of October the division's headquarters were in Bar. On 7 November 1920, it had 407 officers and 4,143 soldiers.

The division suffered heavy losses in the final battles (November 1920) near Popivtsi, which began on November 10 - the second day after the signing of the peace - and continued with the November 11th attack on Katsmaziv village until the defeat near Popivtsi. Thereafter, the division's soldiers were in interned in Polish internment camps at Alexander Kujawski and Szczypyorn.

The Reserve Brigade which was the division's training part during wartime, continued to exist in Brest until the Second Winter Campaign in the fall of 1921 and the tragedy near Bazaar, where the division's officers and soldiers imprisoned by the Bolsheviks, were brutally shot.

The division's composition in July 1920 
Commander - Marko Bezruchko

 Chief of Staff -  
 Staff's Sotnia
 Officers' Sotnia
 Telegraph Platoon
 Field Gendarmerie Platoon
 16th Infantry Brigade -  
 46th Rifle Kurin 
 47th Rifle Kurin
 17th Infantry Brigade -   
 49th Rifle Kurin
 50th Rifle Kurin
 6th Cavalry Regiment -  
 1st Mounted Sotnia
 2nd Mounted Sotnia
 3rd Mounted Sotnia
 6th Field Artillery Regiment -  
 16th Field Artillery Battery 
 17th Field Artillery Battery 
 6th Technical Kurin - 
 1st Sapper Company 
 2nd Sapper Company
 Railway Company 
 Ammunition Company (Park) 
 6th Reserve Rifle Brigade

Footnotes

Bibliography 

Military history of Ukraine
Ukrainian military formations
Military units and formations established in 1920
Military units and formations disestablished in 1921